Du'Plessis Ariu Kirifi (born 3 March 1997) is a New Zealand rugby union player who plays for the  in Super Rugby. His playing position is flanker. He has signed for the Hurricanes squad in 2019.

He attended Francis Douglas Memorial College in New Plymouth and is of Samoan descent.

Reference list

External links
itsrugby.co.uk profile

1997 births
New Zealand sportspeople of Samoan descent
New Zealand rugby union players
Living people
Rugby union flankers
People educated at Francis Douglas Memorial College
Wellington rugby union players
Hurricanes (rugby union) players
Rugby union players from New Plymouth